Erigeron oreophilus  is a North American species of flowering plant in the family Asteraceae, called the chaparral fleabane. It is native to northern Mexico (Chihuahua, Durango, Sonora) and the southwestern United States (Arizona, New Mexico).

Erigeron oreophilus  is a perennial herb up to 90 centimeters (3 feet) tall, with a large taproot. Leaves are pinnatifid with long narrow lobes. The plant generally produces an array of numerous flower heads per stem, each head with up to 75–130 white ray florets surrounding numerous yellow disc florets. The species grows in rocky, open locations in grasslands and conifer woodlands.

References

External links
Photo of herbarium specimen at Missouri Botanical Garden, collected in Chihuahua in 1888, type specimen of Achaetogeron pringlei, syn of Erigeron oreophilus 
Lady Bird Johnson Wildflower Center, University of Texas

Flora of the Southwestern United States
oreophilus
Plants described in 1906